Rudolf Stussi  (born July 23, 1947) is a Swiss-born Canadian painter, animator and illustrator based in Toronto, Canada.

Biography
Stussi came to Canada in 1967 to attend Carleton University. He graduated from the Ontario College of Art in 1978.

Stussi was president of the Canadian Society of Painters in Water Colour (CSPWC) from 1988 to 1991. During his term, he established the CSPWC/SCPA Diploma Collection to document the evolution of water colour painting in Canada. In recognition of his contributions to the CSPWC, the Society awarded him The Julius Griffith Award in 2011.

Stussi was first hired as a background artist in 1987 by Nelvana where he worked on the award-winning series Little Bear and Rolie Polie Olie.

He has illustrated several books, including:
Periwinkle Isn't Paris by Marylin Eisenstein, Tundra Books (Canada), 1999. 
Heidi by Johanna Spyri, Desertina Switzerland, 2000
Feuerlili by Silvio Huonder, Desertina Switzerland, 2012  

He is represented by galleries in Canada, the United States, Switzerland, Germany, Austria and Israel. He was made a member of the Royal Canadian Academy of Arts.

Bibliography
Rudolf Stussi, Painter by Paul Duval, Benteli (Switzerland), 1988

References

External links
 Rudolf Stussi (personal site)

1947 births
Living people
20th-century Canadian painters
Canadian male painters
21st-century Canadian painters
20th-century Swiss painters
20th-century Canadian male artists
Swiss male painters
21st-century Swiss painters
21st-century Canadian male artists
Canadian animators
Canadian children's book illustrators
Swiss children's book illustrators
Swiss animators
Members of the Royal Canadian Academy of Arts
20th-century Swiss male artists